Jagatsinghpur is a Vidhan Sabha constituency of Jagatsinghpur district, Odisha.

This constituency includes Jagatsinghpur, Jagatsinghpur block and Nuagaon block.

Elected members

Fifteen elections were held between 1951 and 2009 including one By-Poll in 1959. Elected members from the Jagatsinghpur constituency are:
2019: (104): Prasanta Kumar Muduli (BJD)
2014: (104): Chiranjib Biswal (Congress)
2009: (104): Bishnu Charan Das (BJD)
2004: (38): Bishnu Charan Das (BJD)
2000: (38): Bishnu Charan Das (BJD)
1995: (38): Bishnu Charan Das (Janata Dal)
1990: (38): Bishnu Charan Das (Janata Dal)
1985: (38): Kailash Chandra Mallik (Congress)
1980: (38): Krushna Chandra Mallik (Congress-I)
1977: (38): Kanduri Charan Mallik (Janata Party)
1974: (38): Laxman Mallick(Congress)
1971: (36): Laxman Mallick (Orissa Jana Congress)
1967: (36): Kanduri Charan Mallik (PSP)
1961: (102): Priyanath Dey (Congress)
1959: (By Poll): Birakishore Das (Congress)
1957: (72): Nilmani Pradhan (Congress) and Kanduri Charan Mallik (PSP)
1951: (74): Nilmani Pradhan (Congress)

2014 election result
In 2014 election, Indian National Congress candidate Chiranjib Biswal defeated Biju Janata Dal candidate Bishnu Charan Das by a margin of 2,888 votes.

2009 election result
In 2009 election, Biju Janata Dal candidate Bishnu Charan Das defeated Indian National Congress candidate Chiranjib Biswal by a margin of 10,077 votes.

Notes

References

Assembly constituencies of Odisha
Jagatsinghpur district